The Calhoun County School District is a public school district in Calhoun County, Georgia, United States, based in Morgan. It serves the communities of Arlington, Edison, Leary, and Morgan.

Schools
The Calhoun County School District has one elementary school and one middle-high school.

Elementary school
Calhoun County Elementary School

Middle-High school
Calhoun County Middle-High School

References

External links

School districts in Georgia (U.S. state)
Education in Calhoun County, Georgia